Udith Fernando (born 16 November 1996) is a Sri Lankan cricketer. He made his first-class debut for Negombo Cricket Club in Tier B of the 2017–18 Premier League Tournament on 28 December 2017.

References

External links
 

1996 births
Living people
Sri Lankan cricketers
Negombo Cricket Club cricketers
People from Negombo